Al-Qubaysiat, or Al-Qubaisiat (القبيسيات), is an Islamic women's organisation established in the early 1960s, based in Damascus-Syria, founded and led by Sheykha Munira al-Qubaysi in Syria.

The Qubaysi group is for women only and is an active part of Syria's Islamic revivalist movement. The group calls for an apolitical Islam. It aims at teaching Syrian young women and girls the Quran, al-Hadith (الحديث النبوي), Tafsir and Islamic values and traditions. It organizes religious lessons in homes and has been instrumental in spreading religious sentiment among young women. Since its early days, the movement has operated semi-openly until it was recognized by Syrian state under Bashar al-Asad government in 2003 and was allowed to openly operate its activities from official mosques.

History
The activities of the Qubaysiat women started in the early 1960. Munira al-Qubaysi منيرة القبيسي the founder of group, is a certified school teacher in natural sciences. After graduation she was appointed as a teacher in various schools in Damascus. Her position as a school teacher enabled her to combine her education work with Islamic preaching. These preaching activities were the reason for her imprisonment a couple of time during the early 1960s. After Hama massacre of 1982 the group was forced to clandestinely carry out its preaching activities until 2003. The group has greatly benefited from the change in the Syrian government's policies towards Islamic revival in the Syrian society. First, Bashar al-Assad removed the law that forbids girls to wear hijab at public schools, then he recognized al-Qubaysiat and called them to openly carry out their activities in public mosques.

Ideology
There is controversy surrounding the ideology of the group. Some claim that the group is influenced by the Sufi ideology of the Kuftariya Naqshbandiya order. The basis for this assumption is the fact that Munira al-Qubaysi herself was a discipline of Sheykh Ahmad Kuftaro.  Also, the nature of the group's work has a Sufi characteristic; it calls for elevating religious and moral consciousness of society by stimulating individual's ethical habits and behavior. The other assumption is that al-Qubaysiat ideology is influenced by Baathism since some members of their groups are sisters and daughters of the Baath Party. This assumption is rather strong since the Group assumed Baathi posts after the 2011 Revolution.

Organization
Like all Sufi orders, the group has a hierarchical organization. Women are distributed among various ranks within the organization. A rank of a member of the group is known by the color of her Hijab. Members of the group are often identified by their distinctive style of dress, a hijab tied with a large knot under the chin, buttoned overcoats coming down the mid-shin level. White hijab is worn by newly recruited members or members with a low degree of commitment to the group's activities. Light blue hijab is worn by members who have been upgraded and are in the middle rank. Besides working of recruiting new girls to the group, members of this rank are entitled with organizational and educational tasks. Organizational tasks range between organizing events and arranging meeting places. Educational tasks are mainly about reciting the Quran and the Sunna with young members of the group. Dark blue hijab is given for active and senior members; these members are entrusted with the task of teaching and preaching more sophisticated texts such as Fiqh, Shareea laws.

References

External links
 Islamic Revival in Syria Is Led by Women, New York Times 29 August 2006
 "القبيسيات" حركة إسلامية نسائية غامضة عضواتها يزدن عن 70 ألفا, Alarabiya, 1 November 2010
 Islamic Revival in Syria Is Led by Women - New York Times, Islamic Revival in Syria Is Led by Women, New York Times, 
 Islamic Revival Led by Women Tests Syria's Secular Identity, 3 September 2006
 , The Rise of the Systerhoods, Carnegie Endowment for International Peace, Sada, 25 April 2013
Line Khatib, Islamic Revival in Syria, The rise and fall of Ba'this secularism.

Islam in Syria
Sufism in Asia